The South Australian Railways C Class locomotives were built by the Robert Stephenson and Company for the South Australian Railways in 1856. The first locomotive (No. 5) was in service by November 1856, with the second engine (No. 6) in service by January 1857. They were both withdrawn after long service lives, with No. 5 being withdrawn after 50 years working on the SAR. No. 6 lasted well into Commissioner Webbs era, finally being withdrawn in 1926 at almost 70 years old.

History
Since the South Australian Railways had the new B class tank engines built to run on the railway line to Gawler, two more locomotives were purchased to also run this service on the lightly laid route. These locomotives were designated the "C class" and their range was increased to include stops at Roseworthy and Kapunda due to the opening of the new line extension on the 13th of August 1860. The C Class was later used the construction of the Tarlee line. In 1884 & 1885, both locomotives were rebuilt and put back into traffic, having acquired new cabs which were complete with circular front and side windows. 

The C Class worked on the northern lines until they were superseded by more powerful locomotives. No. 5 was condemned in 1906 at the age of 50 years, while No. 6 continued to work on the suburban system and performed shunting duties at Mile End and Port Adelaide. No. 6 was eventually withdrawn and scrapped in 1926, after 70 years of service.

References

C
Broad gauge locomotives in Australia
Robert Stephenson and Company locomotives

2-4-0 locomotives 
Passenger locomotives 
Scrapped locomotives